Rozel may refer to:

Le Rozel, Manche, Basse-Normandie, France
Rozel, Kansas, United States
Vingtaine de Rozel, Jersey